Alexander Vladimirovich Oleshko (born 23 July 1976, Chisinau) is a Russian theater and film actor, TV presenter, singer, parodist. Honored Artist of Russia (2015). Member of the Union of Theatre Workers of the Russian Federation .

Biography 
He was born in 1976 in the capital of the Moldavian SSR Chisinau; mother Lyudmila Vladimirovna.

His years of childhood and adolescence were in Moldova. In 1991, aged 15, he moved to Moscow, where he entered the State College of Circus and Variety Art and graduated from it, receiving a red diploma with honors. In 1999 he graduated from the Boris Shchukin Theatre Institute (course of Vladimir Ivanov). Since that year he has been in the troupe of the Moscow Satire Theatre. From 2000 to 2010, in the group of the Sovremennik Theatre. As a guest actor he plays in the plays of the Vakhtangov State Academic Theater.

Teacher of acting at the State College of Circus and Variety Art.

From autumn 2009 until early 2017 he worked as a leading entertainer of a number of entertainment programs on Channel One Russia. In the summer of 2017, he moved to the NTV, since on the Channel One there were no suitable projects for him.

In April and May 2022, Oleshko participated in a series of concerts organized in order to support the 2022 Russian invasion of Ukraine.

References

External links

1976 births
Living people
Actors from Chișinău
Russian male film actors
Russian male television actors
Russian male stage actors
Russian television presenters
Russian game show hosts
Russian male voice actors
Russian male comedians
Honored Artists of the Russian Federation
Russian people of Moldovan descent
21st-century Russian singers
21st-century Russian male singers
Television people from Chișinău